Masthuggstorget is a tram stop of the Gothenburg tram network, located on Första Långgatan, and is one of the other tram stops that are on a grassway. It's the last before it joins routes 1 and 6, at Järntorget. At the next stop, Hagakyrkan, because line 3 is part of the lines that go to Brunnsparken via Valand and Kungsportsplatsen, there is junction. At Grönsakstorget, line 2 joins and forms lines that go to Brunnsparken via Domkyrkan (station currently closed for renovations).

Tram stops in Sweden